Film maker and playwright Bahram Beyzai has produced ten feature films and four shorts.

Films

Films based on Beyzai's books
 Salandar (1981)
 Red Line (1981 film)
 Salandar (1994)
 The Fateful Day (1995)
 Closely
 The Fifth Season (1996 film)

Films edited for other directors
 The Runner (1985 film)

See also
Bahram Beyzai bibliography
Persian cinema
List of Iranian films

References

External links
 

Beyzai, Bahram
filmography

Iranian filmographies